Chahar Muran may refer to:
 Chahar Muran, Chaharmahal and Bakhtiari
 Chahar Muran, Khuzestan

See also
Chahar Maran (disambiguation)